John Millman was the defending champion, but did not participate.
Ivo Karlović won the title, defeating James Blake 6–4, 3–6, 6–4 in the final.

Seeds

Draw

Finals

Top half

Bottom half

References
 Main Draw
 Qualifying Draw

2011 ATP Challenger Tour
2011 Singles